The Cat in the Hat (also known as Dr. Seuss' The Cat in the Hat) is a 2003 American fantasy comedy film directed by Bo Welch in his directorial debut and written by Alec Berg, David Mandel and Jeff Schaffer. Loosely based on Dr. Seuss's 1957 book of the same name, it was the second and final live-action feature-length Dr. Seuss adaptation after How the Grinch Stole Christmas (2000). The film stars Mike Myers in the title role with Alec Baldwin, Kelly Preston, Dakota Fanning, Spencer Breslin, Amy Hill and Sean Hayes in supporting roles.

Production on the film began in 1997 with Tim Allen originally cast in the title role. After Allen dropped out due to scheduling conflicts with The Santa Clause 2, the role went to Myers. Filming took place in California and lasted three months from late 2002 to early 2003. As with the previous Dr. Seuss adaptation, many new characters and subplots were added to the story to bring it up to feature-length.

The film was released in theaters on November 21, 2003 in the United States by Universal Pictures and internationally by DreamWorks Pictures, and was a financial failure, grossing $133.9 million against a budget of $109 million and was panned by critics. Seuss's widow, Audrey Geisel, was critical of the film and decided not to allow any further live-action adaptations of her husband's works, resulting in the cancellation of a sequel based on The Cat in the Hat Comes Back. All Dr. Seuss film adaptations have since been produced using computer animation.

In March 2012, an animated remake was announced by Universal and Illumination, but never came to fruition. As of January 2018, that remake is once again in development, now at Warner Animation Group.

Plot

Conrad and Sally Walden live in Anville with their single mother Joan, who works for neat-freak Hank Humberfloob as a real estate agent and is dating their next-door neighbor Larry Quinn. One day, Joan leaves her children at home with babysitter Mrs. Kwan while she goes to the office, forbidding them to enter the living room which is being kept pristine for an office party she is hosting that night.

After Mrs. Kwan falls asleep, a bump came from the closet. Sally and Conrad go upstairs to investigate, and they meet The Cat in the Hat, an anthropomorphic talking cat with a red-and-white striped top hat and a large red bow tie. They scream and run and try to hide but The Cat quickly comes to them as he introduced himself and wants to teach them how to have fun. In the process, the Cat leaves a trail of destruction throughout the house and releases two troublemakers, named Thing 1 and Thing 2, from a crate which he locks and forbids the children to tamper with, explaining that it is a portal to his world. Despite the Cat's warning, Conrad picks the lock on the crate, which grabs on to the collar of the family dog Nevins, who runs off. The trio drive the Cat's super-powered car to search for Nevins and get the lock back.

Larry is revealed to be an unemployed slob in debt, pretending to be a successful businessman in order to marry Joan for her money. He wants to get Conrad out of the way by sending him to military school. Larry sees Nevins and kidnaps him, but the Cat tricks Larry into returning the dog. Larry goes and tells Joan about the Cat, but they are stalled by the Things' posing as police officers. Larry tells Joan to meet him at the house.

When the kids and the Cat return to the house with the lock, Larry cuts them off and orders them inside the house, where he sneezes uncontrollably due to his allergy to the Cat, who takes the advantage and scares him away, only for them to find out that the house has been transformed into "The Mother of All Messes", with Larry falling into a gooey abyss. The Cat, Sally and Conrad ride on Mrs. Kwan and navigate through the surreal house to find the crate and lock it, whereupon the house returns to its normal proportions but immediately collapses. In a heated argument, the kids discover that the Cat planned the whole day and order him to leave.

Conrad and Sally resign themselves to facing the consequences when Joan comes home, but the Cat returns with a cleaning invention and fixes the house. Conrad and Sally reconcile with the Cat and thank him for everything, and he departs just as Joan arrives. Larry, covered in goo, comes in, thinking he has busted the kids, but when Joan sees the clean house, she doesn't believe his story and dumps him. After the successful party, Joan spends quality time with her kids by jumping on the couch with them, while the Cat and Things 1 and 2 walk off into the sunset.

Cast
 Mike Myers as the Cat in the Hat, a 6 ft. tall, anthropomorphic and humanoid wise-cracking cat who wears an oversized red bow-tie and a magical red-and-white striped top-hat that reveals many humorous gadgets.
 Myers also makes uncredited cameos as the Cat's disguises throughout the film:
 Mr. Catwrench, a mechanic who helps Sally and Conrad fix their couch.
 The Guy in the Sweater Who Asks All the Obvious Questions, the blonde-haired and bespectacled host of the fictional TV cooking show "Astounding Products".
 Cheshire Cat, a chef from Cheshire, England who is a guest on "Astounding Products".
 Zumzizeroo Man, a hippie who offers a petition to stop the senseless, wholesale slaughter of the fictional flatulating, acid-spitting Zumzizeroo creature to Larry as part of the Cat's plan to rescue Nevins.
 Spencer Breslin as Conrad Walden, Joan's destructive and misbehaved 12-year-old son, and the older brother of Sally.
 Dakota Fanning as Sally Walden, Joan's dull, somewhat bossy, well-behaved and rule-obeying 8-year-old daughter, and the younger sister of Conrad.
 Kelly Preston as Joan Walden, Conrad and Sally's single mother, a workaholic real estate agent.
 Alec Baldwin as Larry Quinn, the main antagonist; the Waldens' pompous, lazy and unemployed next-door neighbor who is allergic to cats, steals food from the Waldens unnoticed, and is determined to  marry Joan to mooch off of her wealth and wants to send Conrad to military school to get rid of him.
 Amy Hill as Mrs. Kwan, an overweight and elderly Taiwanese woman who was hired to watch the kids, but sleeps through her job, which (as well as her weight) serves as a running gag.
 Sean Hayes as Hank Humberfloob, Joan's zero-tolerance boss, a germophobe who is seemingly friendly, but is quick to fire employees for even the smallest infractions (such as for shaking his hand which he does not allow since he hates germs), often in an extremely loud tone of voice. 
Hayes is also the voice of the somewhat cynical, pessimistic and sensible family fish.
 Danielle Chuchran and Taylor Rice as Thing 1, and Brittany Oaks and Talia-Lynn Prairie as Thing 2; two gibbering trouble-making creatures that the Cat brings in with him. Dan Castellaneta provided the voices for the Things.
 Steven Anthony Lawrence as Dumb Schweitzer, an intellectually and socially inferior pre-teen boy with a Bronx accent. When Cat disguised himself as the piñata at a birthday party Sally was left out of, he whacks Cat in the groin with a wooden bat.
 Paris Hilton as a female club-goer.
 Bugsy as Nevins, the Waldens' pet dog. Frank Welker provided his voice. Welker had previously provided the voice of Max the dog from How the Grinch Stole Christmas.
 Candace Dean Brown as a secretary who works for Humberfloob Real Estate.
 Victor Brandt as the Narrator, who tells the story; he is revealed to be the Cat using a voice-changer at the end.

Production

Development
DreamWorks Pictures acquired the film rights to the original Dr. Seuss book in 1997. However, production did not officially start until after the 2000 Christmas/comedy film How the Grinch Stole Christmas, by Universal Pictures and Imagine Entertainment, both of whom also joined to finance, distribute and produce the film with DreamWorks, and based on another Dr. Seuss book of the same name, became a commercial success. Brian Grazer, the producer of The Grinch, stated: "Because we grew up with these books, and because they have such universal themes and the illustrations ignite such fantasy in your mind as a child—the aggregation of all those feelings—it leaves an indelible, positive memory. And so when I realized I had a chance to convert first The Grinch and then, The Cat in the Hat, into movies, I was willing to do anything to bring them to the screen." Grazer then contacted Bo Welch over the phone with the offer to direct the film, and he accepted. When production began, songs written by Randy Newman were dropped because they were deemed inferior; Newman's cousin, David, instead composed the score for the film. Although Welch and a publicist for Myers denied it, several people said Myers had considerable input into the film's direction by telling some of the cast (namely co-stars Baldwin and Preston) how to perform their scenes.

Casting
Tim Allen was initially considered for the role of the Cat. The script was initially based on a version of the original book's story conceived by Allen, who admitted that as a child he was afraid of Seuss' "mischievous feline babysitter" and it was his dream to give the edge that scared him for the role. However, the studio did not commission a screenplay until late February 2001, when Alec Berg, David Mandel and Jeff Schaffer (best known for being writers on the television series Seinfeld) were hired by the studio to rewrite the film (replacing the original draft of the film that was written by Eric Roth a few years prior), so the film would not be ready to shoot before the deadline. By this point, Allen was also committed to shooting Disney's The Santa Clause 2, which was also delayed because Allen wanted a script rewrite. Due to scheduling conflicts with that film, he dropped out of the role. Afterwards, both Will Ferrell and Billy Bob Thornton were considered for the role. Eventually, in March 2002 the role of the Cat was given to Mike Myers, whom Grazer had an argument with regarding a proposed film adaptation of Myers' Saturday Night Live sketch Sprockets, which Myers cancelled in June 2000 after being dissatisfied with his own script for it. Myers stated in an interview that he was a long-time fan of the original Dr. Seuss book, and that it was the first book he ever read. Myers was obligated to appear in the film as a result of a settlement related to the Sprockets film's cancellation. Soon after, Myers, Dave Foley, Jay Kogen and Stephen Hibbert did an uncredited rewrites of the script.

Makeup and visual effects
Originally, Rick Baker was set to be the prosthetic makeup designer for the film after his previous experience with How the Grinch Stole Christmas, but due to conflicts with the studio and production team, particularly with Myers' behavior (showing up late to meetings and refusing to come to makeup tests punctually) and the complex challenge of designing the character’s makeup, he left the project and was replaced by Steve Johnson, one of his earliest apprentices. The Cat costume was made of angora and human hair and was fitted with a cooling system. To keep Myers cool during the outdoor shoots, a portable air conditioner was available that connected a hose to the suit between shots, while the tail and ears were battery-operated. Danielle Chuchran and Brittany Oaks, who portrayed Thing 1 and Thing 2, respectively, wore a prosthetic face mask and wig designed by Johnson as well. The Fish was considered somewhat of a unique character for Rhythm and Hues Studios (responsible for the visual effects and animation in films such as Mouse Hunt, Cats & Dogs, The Lord of the Rings: The Return of the King and Scooby-Doo), in that the character had no shoulders, hips or legs, so all of the physical performance had to emit from the eyes, head and fin motion. Sean Hayes, who provided the voice for the Fish, found the role significantly different from his usual on-camera jobs; he did not know how the final animation would look, resulting in all of his voice work taking place alone in a sound booth.

Filming
Prior to filming, giant props for the film were stolen from the set; the local police found the props vandalized with graffiti in a shopping mall car park in Pomona, California. Despite this, no arrests had been made and filming was to start the next week. Principal photography took place mostly in California from October 2002 to January 2003. The neighborhood and the town center was filmed in a rural valley near Simi Valley, where 24 houses (each 26 feet square and 52 feet tall) were constructed. The downtown area outdoor shots were filmed along a Pomona street where a number of antique and gift shops are located. The community decided not to redecorate after filming ended, so the surreal paint scheme and some of the signage could still be seen today as it appears in the film. Because of so much smog in the area, the sky had to be digitally replaced with the cartoon-like sky and colors of the background had to be digitally fixed. Mike Myers was unaware that a piece of the house would fall behind him near the end of the film during his scenes with Spencer Breslin and Dakota Fanning. His reaction was real and left unscripted in the final film.

According to co-star Amy Hill, Myers was difficult to work with on set, refusing to talk to anyone on the production (other than his assistants and director Welch) and isolating himself from the cast and crew during breaks in filming. She also noted that there would be retakes of scenes because Welch, who was a first-time director, would often let Myers decide whether they were good enough or not. In addition, Hill stated that Myers had an assistant who held chocolates in a Tupperware, and whenever Myers needed a piece of chocolate, his assistant would come over and give him one.

Music
Grazer's frequent collaborator, David Newman scored the film, The soundtrack was released on November 18, 2003. Originally, Marc Shaiman was going to compose the score for the film, but due to Newman already being chosen for the film score, Shaiman instead wrote the film's songs with Scott Wittman. The soundtrack also features a song by Smash Mouth ("Getting Better"), which makes it the third Mike Myers-starring film in a row to feature a song by Smash Mouth after Shrek and Austin Powers in Goldmember. The trailer for the film uses a version of "Hey! Pachuco!" by the Royal Crown Revue. The soundtrack also includes two songs performed by Myers, who plays the Cat. Newman's score won a BMI Film Music Award.

Release

Home media
The Cat in the Hat was released on VHS and DVD on March 16, 2004. The DVD features 13 deleted scenes, 36 outtakes, 13 featurettes, a "Dance with the Cat" tutorial to teach children how to do a Cat in the Hat dance, and an audio commentary with director Bo Welch and actor Alec Baldwin. On February 7, 2012, the film was released on Blu-ray.

Reception

Box office
The Cat in the Hat opened theatrically on November 21, 2003 and grossed $38.3 million in its opening weekend, ranking first in the North American box office ahead of Brother Bear, Elf and Looney Tunes: Back in Action. The film ended its theatrical run on March 18, 2004, having grossed $101.1 million domestically and $32.8 million overseas for a worldwide total of $133.9 million.

Critical response
On review aggregator Rotten Tomatoes, the film has an approval rating of 10% based on 164 reviews and an average rating of 3.4/10. The site's critical consensus reads: "Filled with double entendres and potty humor, this Cat falls flat." On Metacritic, the film has a score of 19 out of 100 based on reviews from 37 critics, indicating  "overwhelming dislike".

Peter Travers of Rolling Stone gave the film one star, stating: "Cat, another overblown Hollywood raid on Dr. Seuss, has a draw on Mike Myers, who inexplicably plays the Cat by mimicking Bert Lahr in The Wizard of Oz." Roger Ebert of The Chicago Sun-Times gave the film two out of four stars. Although he praised the production design, he considered the film to be "all effects and stunts and CGI and prosthetics, with no room for lightness and joy". Ebert and co-host Richard Roeper gave the film "Two Thumbs Down" on their weekly movie review program. Roeper said of Myers' performance that "maybe a part of him was realizing as the movie was being made that a live-action version of The Cat in the Hat just wasn't a great idea." Ebert compared the film unfavorably to How the Grinch Stole Christmas: "If there is one thing I've learned from these two movies, it's that we don't want to see Jim Carrey as a Grinch, and we don't want to see Mike Myers as a cat. These are talented comedians, let's see them do their stuff, don't bury them under a ton of technology."

Leonard Maltin gave the film one-and-a-half stars out of four in his Movie Guide: "Brightly colored adaptation of the beloved rhyming book for young children is a betrayal of everything Dr. Seuss ever stood for, injecting potty humor and adult (wink-wink) jokes into a mixture of heavy-handed slapstick and silliness." Maltin also said that the film's official title which included Dr. Seuss' The Cat in the Hat was "an official insult".

Todd McCarthy of Variety praised the film as "attractively designed, energetically performed and, above all, blessedly concise."

Alec Baldwin was disappointed with the film and addressed complaints the film received because of its dissimilarity to the source material. He expressed a belief that a film is "an idea about something" and that because Dr. Seuss' work is so unique, making a feature-length film out of one of his stories would entail taking liberties and making broad interpretations.

Accolades

The film also received three nominations at the Hollywood Makeup & Hairstylists Guild Awards.

Future

Cancelled sequel
On the day of the film's release, Myers stated in an interview that he expected a sequel where the kids meet the Cat again. A sequel based on the original book's sequel The Cat in the Hat Comes Back was in development just over a month before the film's release, with Myers and Welch to return to their duties as actor and director, respectively. Following the film's poor reception however, Seuss's widow, Audrey Geisel, decided not to allow any subsequent live-action adaptations of her late husband's works, resulting in the scrapping of the sequel.

Animated remake
In March 2012, a computer-animated Cat in the Hat film remake was announced by Universal Pictures and Illumination Entertainment following the success of The Lorax, with Rob Lieber set to write the script, Chris Meledandri to produce the film and Geisel to executive-produce it, but it never came to fruition. 

In January 2018, Warner Animation Group picked up the rights for the animated Cat in the Hat film as part of a creative partnership with Seuss Enterprises.

Video game

A platform game based on the film was published by Vivendi Universal Games for PlayStation 2, Xbox, and Game Boy Advance on November 5, 2003, and Microsoft Windows on November 9, shortly before the film's theatrical release.

See also
 List of films based on Dr. Seuss books

References

External links

 
 
 
 
 
 

2003 films
2003 fantasy films
2003 comedy films
2003 directorial debut films
2000s American films
2000s children's fantasy films
2000s children's comedy films
2000s English-language films
2000s fantasy comedy films
American films with live action and animation
American children's comedy films
American children's fantasy films
American fantasy comedy films
The Cat in the Hat
Films about cats
Films about children
Films about obsessive–compulsive disorder
Films based on children's books
Films based on works by Dr. Seuss
Films shot in California
Films shot in Florida
Films shot in Los Angeles
Golden Raspberry Award winning films
Films produced by Brian Grazer
Films with screenplays by Alec Berg
Films with screenplays by David Mandel
Films with screenplays by Jeff Schaffer
Films scored by David Newman
Imagine Entertainment films
DreamWorks Pictures films
Universal Pictures films